Angela Yu Chien (Chinese: 于倩) (1942-2004) was a China-born Hong Kong actress.

Biography
Angela Yu Chien was born in Beijing. She moved to Taiwan with her family at the age of five. In 1960, she moved to Hong Kong and joined the Shaw Brothers Studio's Southern Drama Group as an actress.

Filmography
 1964 Between Tears and Smiles
 1964 The Dancing Millionairess - Miss Xia <ref>{{cite web |URL=http://hkmdb.com/db/movies/view.mhtml?id=4060&display_set=eng |title=The Dancing Millionairess|website=hkmdb.com |date=February 12, 1964 |accessdate=November 6, 2020}}</ref>
 1964 Coffin from Hong Kong as Lee Lai
 1964 Da ji 
 1964 The Story of Sue San as Maid
 1965 Xin hua duo duo kai as Julie Yeh Feng
 1966 Lan yu hei (Shang) as Ji Huiya
 1966 Lan yu hei (Xia) as Ji Huiya
 1966 Kuai lo qing chun 
 1967 Da xia fu chou ji 
 1967 Yu hai qing mo as Shangyuan's Mistress
 1967 Shao nian shi wu er shi shi 
 1967 The Cave of the Silken Web as Third sister
 1967 Qing chun gu wang as Julie
 1968 Hong Kong Rhapsody as Li Tan-Ni 
 1968 Duan hun gu Chao Chien Ying 1969 Diao jin gui as Liu Wen-ying
 1969 Dead End as Mary
 1969 Yiu yan kuang liu as Mona Lin
 1969 Ren tou ma as Lu-no
 1970 The Winged Tiger as Yin Cai Hua
 1971 Chao piao yu wo 
 1975 That's Adultery 
 1975 Hua fei man cheng chun 
 1975 Bruce: Hong Kong Master 
 1975 Xiao Shandong dao Xianggang 
 1976 Killer Elephants 
 1976 Erotic Nights 
 1976 The Oily Maniac 1976 The Web of Death 
 1976 The Drug Connection as Margaret
 1983 Bruce vs. Bill 
 1984 Yi ren zai jian 
 1984 Da xiao bu liang 
 1984 Hong Kong 1941 
 1985 Meng gui po ren 
 1985 Fa gai si doi 
 1987 Tragic Hero as Mrs. Chu
 1988 The Last Conflict (TV movie) as Kin's mom
 1989 Life Is Cheap... But Toilet Paper Is Expensive as Blue Velvet
 1992 Tang xi feng yue hen''

References

External links
 

1942 births
2004 deaths
Hong Kong film actresses
Actresses from Beijing